Crystal Yu is a Hong Kong-born television, film and stage actress. She played Lily Chao in the British BBC medical drama Casualty from 2013 to 2017.

Life and career
Yu, born in Hong Kong, came to London at the age of 11 when she was offered a place at the Elmhurst School of Dance and Performing Arts (formerly known as Elmhurst Ballet School).

As well as acting in theatre, films and TV, she gives up her spare time to work closely with The Royal Academy of Dance and The Jack Petchey Foundation, bringing dance programmes to secondary schools, Special Educational Needs schools and Pupil Referral Units. Yu is fluent in Cantonese, Mandarin and English.

In 2016, Yu was nominated for the Female Actress of the Year honour at the BEAM Awards, an organisation that celebrates minority talent, for her role as Dr. Lily Chao. After four years in Casualty, Yu left the role and her final episode was broadcast on 4 November 2017.

Filmography

Television

Film

References

External links
 Official Website 
 

Living people
Hong Kong film actresses
Hong Kong television actresses
Hong Kong emigrants to England
21st-century Chinese actresses
1980s births
English film actresses
English television actresses
21st-century English actresses
British actresses of Chinese descent
English people of Hong Kong descent